Miss You Already is a 2015 British romantic comedy-drama film directed by Catherine Hardwicke and written by Morwenna Banks, based on Banks' 2013 radio drama Goodbye. The film stars Toni Collette, Drew Barrymore, Dominic Cooper, Paddy Considine, Tyson Ritter, Frances de la Tour, and Jacqueline Bisset. It was screened in the Gala Presentations section of the 2015 Toronto International Film Festival.

The film opened theatrically in the United Kingdom on 25 September 2015 and in the United States on 6 November 2015 with positive critical reviews.

Plot
Milly (Toni Collette) and Jess (Drew Barrymore) are best friends who met in school and do everything together. As they grow older, Milly settles down and marries her rocker boyfriend Kit while Jess becomes an environmentalist and marries her long-time boyfriend Jago.

Milly, busy with her career and her young family, learns that she has breast cancer after a long-delayed check-up. She finds herself unable to tell Kit and, after a week, finally confides in Jess. Once she tells Kit and their children, Scarlett and Ben, Milly tasks Jess with helping her get through chemotherapy and the two women joke around as Milly receives her treatments. During this time period, Jess, who has been unable to conceive naturally, puts off IVF treatments with Jago, feeling that she cannot keep trying to have children while Milly is sick. After Jago grows exasperated, Jess finally decides to give it a shot and the couple manage to conceive a baby shortly after.

The night Jess learns that she is pregnant, Milly learns that though she has responded to the chemotherapy, she still needs a double mastectomy. She goes to a bar and gets drunk and, when Jess retrieves her, confesses that she has a big ego and does not want to appear unattractive. Jess reassures her that she will always want her in her life. Milly goes through with the double mastectomy but Jess finds herself unable to tell Milly she is pregnant as she feels as though her good news would cause Milly grief. Meanwhile, Jess learns Jago must go away to work on an oil-rig to pay for their IVF treatments.

Milly finds herself growing increasingly distant from Kit after the surgery. After he arranges a surprise birthday dinner, Milly walks out, taking Jess with her and the two go all the way to West Yorkshire ostensibly to see the moors where the Brontë sisters grew up, though, in reality, Milly is chasing down a barman, Ace, that she had sex with post-surgery. When Jess discovers the deception, she and Milly argue and she reveals her pregnancy to Milly.

For a while, Milly and Jess are estranged. During this period, Jess learns that she is having a high-risk pregnancy while Milly learns that while her breast cancer is in remission she also has fatal malignant tumours in her brain. Milly tracks down Jess and the women reconcile. She also confesses her affair to Kit and although he feels betrayed, he decides to make love to Milly knowing that her days are numbered. Milly eventually tells her children that she will die and must go into hospice care. While there, she tells Jess she is holding on for the birth of Jess's first child.

Jess goes into labour early while Jago is still on the oil rig. While Kit does not want Milly to attend the labour, her mother, Miranda, helps her sneak out of the hospice so she is able to be there when Jess gives birth. Some days after, Milly dies at the hospice with Jess by her side. A few years later, Jess is pregnant with her second child, and the two families are having lunch together. Jess muses on how her friend was irreplaceable but then recognises a trait of hers in Scarlett.

Cast

 Toni Collette as Milly
 Sophie Holland as 21-year-old Milly
 Lucy Morton as 13-year-old Milly
 Eleanor Stagg as 10-year-old Milly
 Drew Barrymore as Jess
 Charlotte Hope as 21-year-old Jess
 Emily Trappen as 13-year-old Jess
 Grace Schneider as 10-year-old Jess
 Mem Ferda as Achmed
 Dominic Cooper as Kit
 Max Rinehart as 21-year-old Kit
 Paddy Considine as Jago
 Tyson Ritter as Ace
 Frances de la Tour as Jill
 Jacqueline Bisset as Miranda
 Honor Kneafsey as Scarlett
 Ryan Lennon Baker as Ben
 Janice Acquah as Nisha
 Charlotte Ubben as Cheryl
 Shola Adewusi as Athena
 Anjli Mohindra as Kira
 Noah Huntley as company executive

Production

Development
The film is based on Morwenna Banks' radio play Goodbye, which was first broadcast on BBC Radio 4. The project was first announced on 11 February 2012, when Paul Andrew Williams was set to direct and co-wrote the script with Morwenna Banks, Entertainment One had the UK, Canada, and Australian rights to the film.

Casting
On 13 February 2012, It was announced that Jennifer Aniston would star in the film.

On 22 April 2014, it was announced that Catherine Hardwicke was set to direct the film, in which Rachel Weisz, who replaced Aniston and Toni Collette would star as lead actresses. The two leads would play childhood best friends whose relationship becomes troubled when one contracts breast cancer. Hardwicke said about the script,
"When I met Morwenna Banks and read her script, I really felt her passion for this story — this is something she lived through. She managed to take real life and turn it into a powerful, laugh-and-cry-out-loud screenplay."

But on 5 September, Drew Barrymore was added to the cast and replaced Weisz to portray her part along with Collette, Dominic Cooper, Paddy Considine, and Jacqueline Bisset. Cooper and Considine to play husbands of Barrymore and Collette, while Bisset would play Collette's character's mother. On 3 October Tyson Ritter joined the cast of the film to play the love interest of one of the lead female actresses.

Filming
Principal photography began on 7 September 2014 in London and later shooting also took place in West Yorkshire, England. The hospital that features in the film is the UCH Macmillan Cancer Centre.

Release

Distribution
The film was sold to several territories, including Germany, France, Japan, South Korea, and Hong Kong.

Music
The film features the song "There's a Place" from star Tyson Ritter's band The All-American Rejects. It reached number 33 of Billboard's Digital Rock Songs chart, and was met with widely positive reception from critics and fans alike.

Box office
Miss You Already opened theatrically in the United States on 6 November 2015 in 384 venues and earned $552,506 in its opening weekend. The film ended its run 17 days later on 22 November, with a gross of $1,162,653.

Critical reception
The film received positive reviews from critics. On Rotten Tomatoes, the film has a 71% rating based on 117 reviews, with an average rating of 6.04/10. The site's consensus states: "Miss You Already isn't shy about going for filmgoers' tear ducts, but its solid script and talented cast are often powerful enough to make up for its more manipulative moments." Metacritic reports a 59 out of 100 rating, based on 24 critics, indicating "mixed or average reviews".

Home media
Miss You Already was released on region 1 DVD and Blu-ray on 1 March 2016.

References

External links
 
 
 
 
 Catherine Hardwicke's 'Miss You Already' scores sales

2015 films
2015 romantic comedy-drama films
British romantic comedy-drama films
Entertainment One films
Films about cancer
Films directed by Catherine Hardwicke
Films scored by Harry Gregson-Williams
Films set in London
Films shot in London
British female buddy films
2010s female buddy films
2010s English-language films
2010s British films